The Carlos Palanca Memorial Awards for Literature winners for 2015.

English division 
Novel
 Grand prize: "All My Lonely Islands" by Victorette Joy Z. Campilan
Judges: 

Short story 
 First prize: "Phallic Symbols " by Alexis A. L. Abola
 Second prize: "The Backroom Angels Buggaloo " by Maria Carmen G. Aquino Sarmiento
 Third prize: "The Storyteller" by Hammed Q. Bolotaolo

Short story for children
 First prize: "Monster Rescue: A Children’s Story for Adult Readers " by Raymond G. Falgui
 Second prize: "The Bear" by Victoria Estrella C. Bravo
 Third prize: "The Three Questions of Tarongoy " by Jonathan R. Guillermo

Essay
 First prize: "Symphony of Dry Winds in a Time without Rain" by Eli Rueda Guieb III
 Second prize: "Violence, A Biography" by Jennifer Dela Rosa Balboa
 Third prize: "The Bangkok Masseur" by Miguel Antonio N. Lizada
Judges: 

Poetry
 First prize: "An Abundance of Selves" by Charisse-Fuschia A. Paderna
 Second prize: "There Are No Monsters" by Arkaye Kierulf
 Third prize: "Aria and Trumpet Flourish" by Rodrigo V. Dela Peña Jr.

Poetry for children
 First prize: "The Rainbow Collection" by Peter Solis Nery
 Second prize: "Ordinary Adventures" by Patricia Celina A. Ngo
 Third prize: "The Cockroach’s Prayer" by Elyrah L. Salanga-Torralba

One-act play
 First prize: "The Adopted Healthy Baby" by Layeta P. Bucoy
 Second prize: "Looking for Ulysses" by Jose Elvin Bueno
 Third prize: "The Hawk and the Viper" by Jonathan R. Guillermo

Full Length Play
 First prize: "No Winner"
 Second prize: "Obando" by Jose Maria Manalo
 Third prize: "Haiyan" by Jorshinelle Taleon-Sonza

Filipino division 
Nobela (Novel)
 Grand prize: "Toto O. " by Charmaine Mercader Lasar

Maikling Kuwento (Short story)
 First prize: Ang Reyna ng Espada at mga Pusar by John Carlo I. Pacala
 Second prize: Mag-ambahan Tayo by Lilia Quindoza Santiago
 Third prize: "Johnson at Putol" by Andrian M. Legaspi

Maikling Kuwentong Pambata (Short story for children)
 First prize: "Sulat sa Birhen " by Manuelita Contreras-Cabrera
 Second prize: "Ang Alamat ng Gulugod Baka " by Salvador T. Biglaen
 Third prize:  "Ang Hiling sa Punso " by Corazon L. Santos

Sanaysay (Essay)
 First prize: "Silat" by Adelma L. Salvador
 Second prize: " Tawag ng Pangangailangan " by Dionie Cabral Tañada
 Third prize: " Ang Tiktik sa Kalye Moriones " by Jayson Bernard B. Santos

Tula (Poetry)
 First prize: " Mula sa Silong " by Christa I. De La Cruz 
 Second prize: " Sa Antipolo pa rin ang Antipolo " by Abner Dormiendo
 Third prize: " Sapagkat Umiibig: Mga Tula " by Christian Jil R. Benitez

Tulang Pambata (Poetry for children)
 First prize: " Ang Iisang Paa ng Tsinelas " by Errol A. Merquita
 Second prize: " Si Iking Pasaway " by John Romeo Leongson Venturero
 Third prize: "No Winner"

Dulang May Isang Yugto (One-act play)
 First prize: "Sa Isang Hindi Natatanging Umaga, at Ang Mga Ulap ay Dahan-Dahang Pumaibabaw sa Nabubulok na Lungsod " by Allan B. Lopez
 Second prize: "Mal" by Vladimeir B. Gonzales 
 Third prize: "Igba" by Marco Antonio R. Rodas

Dulang May Ganap na Haba (Full-length play)
 First prize: " Mga Buhay na Apoy " by Kanakan Balintagos 
 Second prize: "Diwata ng Bayan " by Edgardo B. Maranan
 Third prize: "Maniacal" by George A. De Jesus III

Dulang Pampelikula (Screenplay)
 First prize: " Pink o Blue " by Eloisa Angeli Andrada Palileo
 Second prize: " Sekyu" by Brylle B. Tabora
 Third prize: " Alyas FPJ " by Nita Eden So

Regional languages division 
Short story - Cebuano
 First prize: "Tuba" by Lamberto G. Ceballos
 Second prize: "Sa Lalaking Naligsan sa may Interseksyon" by Manuel M. Avenido Jr.
 Third prize: "Liboa’g Usa Ka Hugon-Hugon Kabahin sa Tagulilong" by Januar E. Yap

Short story - Hiligaynon
 First prize: "Amburukay" by Jesus C. Insilada
 Second prize: "Kalamay Nga Pula" by Ritchie D. Pagunsan
 Third prize: "Ang Lapsag sa Taguangkan ni Belen" by Gil S. Montinola

Short story - Ilokano
 First prize: No Winner
 Second prize: No Winner
 Third prize: "Ti Naimas a Luto ni Inangko ken Dagiti Babbai iti Biwong " by Rhea Rose  Domasing Berroy

Kabataan division 
English
 First prize: " That Man, That Hero in Our Stories " by Catherine Regina Hanopol Borlaza
 Second prize: " A Loaded Gun in the House Next Door " by Richard C. Cornelio
 Third prize: " Until Transcendence " by Annicka B. Koteh

Filipino
 First prize: "Hindi Ko Alam " by Karl Gabrielle B. De Los Santos
 Second prize: "Ang Nakakikiliting Kalabit ng Bukang- Liwayway " by Lance Lauren L. Santiago
 Third prize: " Kahimanawari: Mga Kwentong Aswang ni Lola Basyang " by Jason Renz D. Barrios

References 

 https://web.archive.org/web/20160831135956/http://www.palancaawards.com.ph/Testing3/uncategorized/winners-for-2015-65th-carlos-palanca-memorial-awards/

External links 
Carlos Palanca Memorial Awards for Literature

2015
Palanca